Henry Fuchs (born 20 January 1948 in Tokaj, Hungary) is a fellow of the American Academy of Arts and Sciences (AAAS) and the Association for Computing Machinery (ACM) and the Federico Gil Professor of Computer Science at the University of North Carolina at Chapel Hill (UNC). He is also an adjunct professor in biomedical engineering.

His research interests are in computer graphics, particularly rendering algorithms, hardware, virtual environments, telepresence systems, and applications in medicine.

Fuchs was elected a member of the National Academy of Engineering in 1997 for contributions to computer graphics hardware and algorithms.

Career 
Fuchs started his career as a programmer and consultant at the University of California at Santa Cruz, and as an engineer and consultant at the Image Processing Laboratory of NASA Jet Propulsion Laboratory in the California Institute of Technology. After the completion of his PhD in computer science in 1975 at the University of Utah, he became an adjunct associate professor of mathematical sciences and of medical computer science at the University of Texas at Dallas. In 1983 he became a professor of Computer Science at the University of North Carolina at Chapel Hill, and in 1988 he was promoted to the Federico Gil Distinguished Professor there, a position he still holds.

Awards and honours 
In 1997 Fuchs became a member of the National Academy of Engineering (NAE).  In 1992, he received both the ACM SIGGRAPH Achievement Award and the Academic Award of the National Computer Graphics Association (NCGA), and in 1997 he received the Satava Award of the Medicine Meets Virtual Reality Conference. In 2013 he was honored with the IEEE-VGTC Virtual Reality Career Award, and was awarded the Steven Anson Coons Award for Outstanding Creative Contributions to Computer Graphics in 2015. In 2018 Henry Fuchs received an Honorary Doctorate from TU Wien.

References

External links 
 
 Henry Fuchs home page at the Department of Computer Science, University of North Carolina at Chapel Hill
 

American computer scientists
Computer graphics researchers
Fellows of the American Academy of Arts and Sciences
Fellows of the Association for Computing Machinery
American people of Hungarian-Jewish descent
20th-century American Jews
Living people
Members of the United States National Academy of Engineering
University of North Carolina at Chapel Hill faculty
University of Texas at Dallas faculty
University of Utah alumni
Virtual reality pioneers
1948 births
21st-century American Jews